Order of the Serbian Flag is the second highest state order of Serbia.
The order is awarded by the decree of the President of Serbia on special occasions. It is awarded for development of international relations between the Republic of Serbia and other countries.

Ranks
Order of the Serbian Flag has three classes.

Notable recipients

1st class

 2023 -  Stanislav Hočevar

 2023 -  Sahil Babayev

 2023 -  Richard Grenell

 2021 -  Péter Szijjártó
2021 -  Andrija Mandić
2020 -  Nikolay Aleksandrovich Mukhin
 2019 -  Ahmed Aboul Gheit
 2017 -  Patriarch Theodore II of Alexandria
 2017 -  Vitaly Churkin
 2017 -  Ahmed Aboul Gheit
 2016 -  Sergey Lavrov
 2016 -  Tedros Adhanom
 2013 -  Miguel Ángel Moratinos
 2012 -  Georgy Poltavchenko 
 2012 -  Sergey Shoygu

2nd class

 2021 -  Steve Stivers
 2019 -  Alexey Miller
 2014 -  Đorđe Mihailović
 2013 -  Mohammed Dahlan

3rd class
 2013 -  Vagif Mustafayev
 2012 -  Patrick Besson

See also 
 Orders, decorations and medals of Serbia

References

Awards established in 2009